"My Point of No Return" is the 22nd and final episode of season six and the 139th episode of the American sitcom Scrubs. It aired on May 17, 2007 on NBC. It is part two of the two-part season finale, preceded by "My Rabbit".

Plot

Kim moves in with J.D. so that they can raise their child and Elliot continues to plan her wedding to Keith. Meanwhile, members of Janitor's "brain trust", although Doug has been replaced with Lloyd, help Keith to become a better potential husband. J.D. learns about fatherhood and Dr. Cox's daughter, Jennifer Dylan, is baptized. But as J.D. and Elliot make big changes in their lives with their two respective relationships, they begin to wonder whether they should really be with each other.

Dr. Cox finally convinces Jordan to get rid of J.D. as the godfather of their baby and replace him with their son, Jack.  They also choose Carla as the godmother.

At the end of the episode, J.D. and Elliot try to comfort each other in the on-call room as they are each questioning their commitments.  They talk about their past relationship (how they were perfect for each other, with matching faults and fears of commitment) and their anxiety about the future, especially since both of them seemed to have crossed "points of no return," in their respective relationships.  They realize that to escape their respective relationships, they would have to "do something huge" or "go nuclear." The episode ends with a montage, first of Turk and Carla together, then Cox and Jordan together, then Keith alone, then Kim alone, with J.D. and Elliot leaning in for a kiss, although the episode (and season) ends without showing if anything actually happened, leaving the conclusion for the beginning of next season.

Production details
 Scrubs''' creator and producer Bill Lawrence stated in an interview before the premiere of Season 7 that this episode was originally supposed to be the last, as at the time it aired, NBC still had not renewed the contract for another season. The purpose of the episode's ending was to leave it ambiguous to the viewers in case the show did not get renewed.
 Elliot wears scrubs, which she has not done in 2 years. In the podcast commentary of "My Cold Shower," Sarah Chalke refers to this in that it reminds her how much more comfortable the scrubs are than the heels that she usually wears.
The suit J.D. wears to the christening is the same suit he bought in My New Suit  (although JD's brother Dan appeared to have taken it to a job interview).

Continuity
 This is the first time we see Jordan and Dr. Cox's daughter Jennifer Dylan.
 When J.D. and Elliot talk about their lives, the viewer can see the words "PEACE SAM" stuck to the locker's door behind J.D. The same words can be seen in the locker room in "My Screw Up."
 J.D. is seen writing his godfather speech in his unicorn journal, a gift given to him in "My Unicorn" by Gregory Marks, a patient at Sacred Heart.
 The Janitor's Brain Trust consists of different people than it did when it was last seen in "My Best Laid Plans".

Cameos
 During J.D's fantasy in which everyone leaves the lobby as Dr. Cox becomes enraged, Scrubs'' creator Bill Lawrence and one of the episode's writers Neil Goldman have cameos as two men running out of the gift shop with stuffed animals.
 Mike Henry has a cameo in this episode as the new urologist.
 The plans for Elliot's bachelorette party that Carla shows has a list of names of people invited, all of whom are production members of the show.

External links
 

Scrubs (season 6) episodes
2007 American television episodes